"Extracts from Adam's Diary: Translated from the Original Ms." is a comic short story by the American humorist and writer Mark Twain. It was first published as a book in 1904, by Harper & Bros. with numerous illustrations by Frederick Strothmann. The story was first published in 1893, The Niagara Book (Buffalo: Underhill and Nichols), pp. 93–109.

Adam (based on Twain himself) describes how Eve (modeled after his wife Livy) gets introduced into the Garden of Eden, and how he has to deal with "this new creature with the long hair." The piece gives a humorous account of the Book of Genesis. It begins with the introduction of Eve, described as an annoying creature with a penchant for naming things, which Adam could do without. It moves on to detail Eve eating the apple and finding Cain, a perplexing creature which Adam can not figure out. He devotes his ironically scientific mind to demystifying Cain's species, thinking it a fish, then a kangaroo, then a bear. Eventually he figures out it is a human, like himself.

The work is humorous and ironic, and gives a new spin on Genesis: few people have considered what life must have been like for Adam, who is discovering everything anew. The work does not consider God's role at all, and eventually, despite his initial deep annoyance with Eve, Adam finds himself in love with her.

References

External links
 
 https://books.google.com/books?id=fMOxoqRJHIoC&printsec=frontcover&source=gbs_ge_summary_r&cad=0#v=onepage&q&f=false
 http://www.loyalbooks.com/book/extracts-from-adams-diary-by-mark-twain

1904 American novels
Novels by Mark Twain
Fictional diaries
Harper & Brothers books
Cultural depictions of Adam and Eve